Ceratina cockerelli is a species of small carpenter bee in the family Apidae. It is found in the Caribbean Sea and North America.

References

Further reading

External links

 

cockerelli
Articles created by Qbugbot
Insects described in 1907